Puno Quechua, also known as Quechua Collao (Qullaw), is a dialect of the Southern Quechua language, spoken in southern Peru near Bolivia.

See also 
 Quechuan and Aymaran spelling shift

References 

Languages of Peru
Southern Quechua